The Anthropological Society of South Australia was established in 1926 with the aim to promote the study of anthropology, archaeology and other related disciplines.

Early members of the society included Norman Tindale, Charles Mountford, Frederic Wood Jones, Thomas Campbell and Robert Pulleine who were pioneers in the study of anthropology and archaeology in Australia. The Society gathered an important ethnographic collection, compiled by members from a range of sources and other documentary materials collected in the 1920s, which is now housed in the South Australian Museum.

The society produces an annual journal called Journal of the Anthropological Society of South Australia.

References

External links
Official website

Anthropology organizations
Anthropology
Archaeology of Australia
Clubs and societies in South Australia
Scientific organizations established in 1926
1926 establishments in Australia